Krešo Omerzel (12 March 1957 – 25 October 2016) was a Slovenian motorcycle speedway rider and coach from Krško.

Career
The career started in year 1975 and ends in 1998. He is a two times champion of Slovenia after winning the Slovenian Individual Speedway Championship in 1985 and 1993.

Family
He was married and father of two sons.

Honours 
Slovenian Champion: 1985 and 1993 
State championship doubles: 1983 (with Žibert) 
State championship doubles: 1996 (with Šantej)
Slovenian Club Champion: 1982  (with AMD Krško)
Slovenian Club Champion: 1983  (with AMD Krško)
Slovenian Club Champion: 1984  (with AMD Krško)
Slovenian Club Champion: 1985  (with AMD Krško)
Slovenian Club Champion: 1988  (with AMTK Ljubljana)
Slovenian Club Champion: 1991  (with AMTK Ljubljana)

References

1957 births
2016 deaths
Slovenian speedway riders
Sportspeople from Novo Mesto